Daniil Aleksandrovich Penchikov (born 21 March 1998) is a Russian football player who plays for Kazakhstani club FC Aktobe on loan from FC Pari Nizhny Novgorod. His positions are right back and left back.

Club career
He made his debut in the Russian Football National League for FC Zenit-2 Saint Petersburg on 8 July 2017 in a game against FC Shinnik Yaroslavl.

On 16 July 2021 he joined Russian Premier League club FC Nizhny Novgorod, reuniting with Aleksandr Kerzhakov who coached him at FC Tom Tomsk in the previous season. He made his RPL debut for Nizhny Novgorod on 1 August 2021 in a game against FC Ural Yekaterinburg.

On 10 February 2023, Penchikov was loaned to FC Aktobe in Kazakhstan until 30 November 2023.

Career statistics

References

External links
 
 
 Profile by Russian Football National League

1998 births
Footballers from Saint Petersburg
Living people
Russian footballers
Association football defenders
FC Zenit-2 Saint Petersburg players
FC Tom Tomsk players
FC Nizhny Novgorod (2015) players
FC Aktobe players
Russian First League players
Russian Premier League players
Russian expatriate footballers
Expatriate footballers in Kazakhstan
Russian expatriate sportspeople in Kazakhstan